Remi Mark Moses (born 14 November 1960) is an English former footballer who played as a defensive midfielder.

He broke into the first team at West Bromwich Albion under the management of Ron Atkinson in the late 1970s, when Albion were enjoying a strong run of form which saw them finish in the top five for all but one season between 1977 and 1981, and also reached a UEFA Cup quarter-final.

Whilst a West Bromwich Albion player he played in a benefit match for Len Cantello, that saw a team of white players play against a team of black players.

In the autumn of 1981, Moses was transferred from West Bromwich Albion to Manchester United for £500,000, arriving at Old Trafford a month before Bryan Robson who went for a club record £1.5 million.

He made his United debut on 19 September 1981 against Swansea City. He scored his first goal for United in the same season, and in doing so became the first black player to score for the club.

Moses was a key midfielder for United during the 1980s, but suffered a succession of serious injuries. He missed the FA Cup final triumphs of 1983 due to suspension and 1985 due to injury, and played his last game for the club in the 1987–88 season.

He was on the verge of being capped for the England team in 1985 before an injury ruled him out of action, causing him to miss most of the 1985–86 season. He also faced competition from Norman Whiteside for a place in central midfield, after Whiteside was converted from a striker to a midfielder.

Injuries had gradually forced him out of the team and he finally announced his retirement from playing in the 1988–89 season at the age of just 28.

In 2000, Moses was working as a property dealer in Alkrington, Greater Manchester, and in his spare time, coaching the Manchester Warriors under-20 inline skating side, which had just won the GB Inline Hockey League and "every other trophy going".

References

External links
 United Legends – Remi Moses
 Appearance data
 The hunting dogs – Phil Ball

1960 births
Living people
People from Miles Platting
English footballers
England under-21 international footballers
Association football midfielders
West Bromwich Albion F.C. players
Manchester United F.C. players
Black British sportsmen